Reg Evenden (25 January 1919 – 8 January 1981) was an Australian rules footballer who played with Footscray in the Victorian Football League (VFL).

Notes

External links 
		

1919 births
1981 deaths
Australian rules footballers from Victoria (Australia)
Western Bulldogs players